The 2011–12 Munster Rugby season was Munster's eleventh season competing in the Pro12, alongside which they also competed in the Heineken Cup. It was Tony McGahan's fourth and final season as Director of Rugby.

Summary
Munster were drawn in Pool 1 of the 2011–12 Heineken Cup alongside Scarlets, Northampton Saints and Castres. Munster defeated Northampton 23–21 in their opening pool fixture on 12 November 2011, thanks to an 84th minute drop-goal from Ronan O'Gara. One week later, away from home against Castres, a last-gasp drop-goal from O'Gara again handed victory to Munster, this time 27–24. In the December double-header against Scarlets, Munster emerged victorious from both fixtures, firstly defeating the Welsh side 17–14 in the away leg, before winning 19–13 at home. In Round 5, Munster beat Castres 26–10 at Thomond Park to become the first side to qualify for the quarter-finals. A 51–36 win away from home against Northampton in the sixth and final round, including a hat-trick from Simon Zebo, secured a home quarter-final for Munster. However, in the quarter-final, Munster were beaten 22–16 at home by provincial rivals Ulster, ending their Heineken Cup campaign for the 2011–12 season.

In the 2011–12 Pro12, Munster finished third with 67 points, in a season that included 14 wins, 1 draw and 7 defeats after 22 regular matches. In the play-offs, Munster lost 45–10 away to eventual champions Ospreys, in a match that was Tony McGahan's final as Munster head coach. New Zealander Rob Penney was subsequently confirmed as Munster's new head coach.

2011–12 Playing Squad

Pre-season

2011–12 Pro12

Play-offs

Semi-final

2011–12 Heineken Cup

Pool 1

Quarter-final

References

External links
2011–12 Munster Rugby season official site

2011–12
2011–12 Pro12 by team
2011–12 in Irish rugby union
2011–12 Heineken Cup by team